The Primitives Group is a Czech psychedelic rock group. 

Founded in 1967, they broke up two years later in 1969. The Primitives Group played cover versions of songs originally performed by The Doors, The Fugs, Pretty Things, The Jimi Hendrix Experience, The Animals, Mothers of Invention and the Velvet Underground, among others. The Primitives Group joined The Plastic People of the Universe in the 1970s. They reformed in 2016, starting their comeback tour on 18 August 2016 at the Liboc Brewery.

References 

Czech rock music groups
Czech psychedelic rock groups
Czech underground music groups
Musical groups established in 1967
Musical groups disestablished in 1969
1967 establishments in Czechoslovakia
1969 disestablishments in Czechoslovakia